The South Africa A Team Triangular Series in 2013 is a List A cricket tournament that was held in South Africa between South Africa A, Australia A and India A. All the matches were played at the LC de Villiers Oval in Pretoria.

Squads

Points table

Fixtures

Group stage

Round 1

Round 2

Final

See also
Australia A Team Quadrangular Series in 2014

References

External links
 

International cricket competitions in 2013
One Day International cricket competitions